Mardoché Samuel Pompée (born 12 April 1994, La Gonâve, Haiti) is a Haitian footballer who currently plays for Violette.

Club career
Pompée started his career with Valencia of Léogâne and won the Ligue Haïtienne in 2012.

At the end of his time with Valencia, Pompée then signed a two-year contract with third division Portuguese club G.D. Gafanha.

After his stint in Portugal, Pompée returned to his native Haiti to play for Don Bosco.

Pompée and his club Don Bosco qualified for the 2016–17 CONCACAF Champions League, where he started in all four matches before being eliminated.

International career
Pompée made his international debut for the Haiti national football team against Trinidad and Tobago on 8 January 2017.

References

External links

1994 births
Living people
Haitian footballers
Haiti international footballers
People from Ouest (department)
Ligue Haïtienne players
Association football defenders
Valencia FC (Haiti) players
G.D. Gafanha players
Don Bosco FC players
Haitian expatriate footballers
Expatriate footballers in Portugal
Haitian expatriate sportspeople in Portugal